Station at the Horizon is a novel by Erich Maria Remarque, a German veteran of World War I. The book describes the search for love of an ex-soldier and an ex-race car driver, Kai, who is torn between Barbara, a girl from the village, Maud, an American middle-class woman, and Lilian Dunquerke, a countess.

The novel was first published in 1927/28, in a German sports magazine Sport im Bild. However, it was not published as a book until 1998.

References

 https://www.goodreads.com/book/show/16092288-station-at-the-horizon?rating=5

Novels by Erich Maria Remarque
Kiepenheuer & Witsch books
Motorsports in fiction